Simon Lowe is a British actor.

Simon Lowe may also refer to:
 Simon Lowe (footballer) (born 1962), English former footballer
Simon Lowe (Ned's Declassified School Survival Guide)
Simon Lowe (MP) (died 1578), MP for Stafford and New Shoreham